George Selk (May 15, 1893 – January 22, 1967) was an American film and television actor. He was known for playing the role of stableman Moss Grimmick in the American western television series Gunsmoke from 1955 to 1963.

Selk portrayed Geppetto in Pinocchio's Christmas in La Canada, California. His other work on stage included acting in a production of Rope in Montrose, California.

Partial filmography 

 Cry of the Hunted (1953) - Josh (uncredited)
 It Came from Outer Space (1953) - Tom
 All I Desire (1953) - Townsman (uncredited)
 City of Bad Men (1953) - Old-Timer (uncredited)
 So Big (1953) - Johnnes Ambuul (uncredited)
 Trader Tom of the China Seas (1954) - Ole
 Phantom of the Rue Morgue (1954) - Lamplighter (uncredited)
 Rogue Cop (1954) - Parker (uncredited)
 The Bounty Hunter (1954) - Hotel Guest (uncredited)
 The Silver Chalice (1954) - Audience Member (uncredited)
 Battle Cry (1955) - Old Man (uncredited)
 The Prodigal (1955) - Citizen (uncredited)
 The McConnell Story (1955) - Janitor (uncredited)
 I'll Cry Tomorrow (1955) - Switchman (uncredited)
 Storm Center (1956) - Bill the Elevator Operator (uncredited)
 The Fastest Gun Alive (1956) - Doctor (uncredited)
 Bus Stop (1956) - Elderly Passenger (uncredited)
 The Spirit of St. Louis (1957) - Mechanic (uncredited)
 The Vampire (1957) - Mr. Spine (uncredited)
 The Hard Man (1957) - Clerk (uncredited)
 Gun Fever (1958) - Farmer
 The FBI Story (1959) - Janitor/Organist (uncredited)
 Guns of the Timberland (1960) - Amos Stearns
 The Bramble Bush (1960) - Clerk (uncredited)
 All the Fine Young Cannibals (1960) - Minister (uncredited)

References

External links 

Rotten Tomatoes profile

1893 births
1967 deaths
People from Lincoln, Nebraska
Male actors from Nebraska
American male film actors
American male television actors
20th-century American male actors
Western (genre) television actors